Palatine is a village in Cook County, Illinois, United States. It is a northwestern residential suburb of Chicago. As of the 2020 census, it had a population of 67,908. As of the 2010 Census, it was the seventh-largest community in Cook County and the 18th-largest in Illinois.

History
The first European-American to settle in Palatine is generally thought to be George Ela, who built a log cabin in the area now called Deer Grove. Ela was one of the first of a wave of pioneers to migrate to northern Illinois following the Black Hawk War. A road that passes through the western edge of Palatine is called Ela Road in his honor.  Palatine is thought to be named after a town in New York.

The Village of Palatine was founded in 1866. It was built around a station on the new Chicago and North Western Railway. Joel Wood surveyed and laid out the village, earning him the title of Palatine's founder. One of Palatine's original downtown streets is named after Wood.

In 1920, the Indian Fellowship League held its first American Indian Day celebration at Camp Reinberg, in Palatine. According to the Daily Herald, the festivities were attended by 60,000 people, which packed the highways leading to the camp with motorists.

A shortline railroad, the Palatine, Lake Zurich and Wauconda Railroad, was built in 1911, and began full passenger service to Wauconda, Illinois, in 1912. The line was closed in 1924 after a series of financial misfortunes and the improvement of roads in the area. The PLZ&W provided transportation to Dr. Wilson's Deer Grove Park, just north of Dundee Road in Palatine.

Palatine's first suburb-style subdivision was called Palanois Park, built shortly after World War II. The town has experienced rapid growth since the 1970s, part of Chicago's growing suburban sprawl. Palatine was home to the Cook County Fair from 1914 to 1931. The fairgrounds are now a subdivision, Fairgrounds Park, whose name pays tribute to Palatine's former fairgrounds.

During the early 1990s, Palatine along with neighboring Rolling Meadows and far northern suburb Zion were sued by atheist activist Rob Sherman over its village seal and seal-defaced flag, which had a Christian cross, among other things, inside an outline of an eagle. A 1992 advisory referendum to keep the seal passed, but another referendum to use public funds to defend the seal failed, leading the village to drop the seal. While Rolling Meadows and Zion developed new seals with the crosses removed, Palatine has since been without an official seal or flag, and is Illinois' largest city or village to be so. The French tricolor reflecting the village's sister city relationship with Fontenay-le-Comte, France, has flown at times on the flagpole meant for the village flag outside the village hall.

In 1993, a multiple homicide, the Brown's Chicken massacre, received national attention.

Palatine has been in the process of revitalizing its downtown area since December 1999. This process has spawned a new passenger train station, a nearby parking garage, and several new condominiums, rowhomes, and commercial buildings.

In 2008, Palatine made news by threatening to secede from Cook County over the latter's sales tax hike; as a result of the tax hike, Palatine's sales tax is 9.0%. In 2009, residents of Palatine Township (which includes the village of Palatine) overwhelmingly voted to pass an advisory referendum stating that they would like to secede from Cook County.

Geography

Palatine's shape resembles that of the head of an axe.

Palatine is in a wooded marshland where several streams rise around the village. Most of these streams meet up with Salt Creek which rises at Wilke Marsh on the village's east side. The most notable exception is the northeast side, where its streams lie in the Buffalo Creek watershed. A small part of the east and southeast sides lies in the McDonald Creek watershed.

Demographics
As of the 2020 census there were 67,908 people, 26,804 households, and 17,120 families residing in the village. The racial makeup of the village was 63.88% White, 12.95% Asian, 3.11% African American, 0.85% Native American, 0.03% Pacific Islander, 9.79% from other races, and 9.40% from two or more races. Hispanic or Latino of any race were 19.59% of the population.

There were 26,804 households, out of which 56.20% had children under the age of 18 living with them, 47.00% were married couples living together, 11.57% had a female householder with no husband present, and 36.13% were non-families. 28.32% of all households were made up of individuals, and 10.17% had someone living alone who was 65 years of age or older. The average household size was 3.15 and the average family size was 2.52.

The village's age distribution consisted of 24.0% under the age of 18, 6.3% from 18 to 24, 28.9% from 25 to 44, 26.9% from 45 to 64, and 13.9% who were 65 years of age or older. The median age was 37.8 years. For every 100 females, there were 91.1 males. For every 100 females age 18 and over, there were 95.4 males.

The median income for a household in the village was $83,495, and the median income for a family was $108,166. Males had a median income of $55,157 versus $39,378 for females. The per capita income for the village was $43,978. About 7.2% of families and 9.9% of the population were below the poverty line, including 18.7% of those under age 18 and 3.8% of those age 65 or over.

Note: the US Census treats Hispanic/Latino as an ethnic category. This table excludes Latinos from the racial categories and assigns them to a separate category. Hispanics/Latinos can be of any race.

The village is home to a large Sikh gurdwara on its northwest side that is visited by Sikhs from across the country.

Economy

Weber-Stephen Products, manufacturer of the Weber grill, is headquartered in Palatine.

Top employers
According to Palatine's 2020 Comprehensive Annual Financial Report, the top employers in the city are:

Arts and culture

 Streetfest: Similar to Taste of Chicago, this event includes lines of food vendors down the streets of Downtown Palatine, with music playing and games and other fun activities going on at the same time. This happens at the end of every summer (August) every year and is meant for families and friends to enjoy.
 Fourth of July Celebration: Another tradition of Palatine is the schedule of Fourth of July events that occur every year. From an annual parade, to fireworks which traditionally occur on the third of July, to the carnival that comes into town, Palatine is full of the traditional celebration of every Fourth of July holiday. Events are for members of all ages, and are things that occur every year.
 Oktoberfest A newer tradition, this celebration started in 2008 and is hosted by the Rotary Club of Palatine.  Live German music, craft and imported beer, and local food vendors celebrate Palatine's German roots. This is an all-ages celebration, but Family Day on Saturday morning has activities geared toward younger folks.  The event begins Friday night on the third weekend in September.

Parks and recreation

The Palatine Park District serves 85,000 residents within the Palatine, Rolling Meadows, Arlington Heights, Inverness, Hoffman Estates and Barrington communities. It is governed by five elected park commissioners who oversee a professional staff.

The Palatine Park District operates swimming pools at Family Aquatic Center, Birchwood, and Eagle, as well as recreational centers at its Community Center, Birchwood, and Falcon Park – which opened in January 2010. The district purchased Palatine Stables in 1989, and the facility is home to approximately 70 horses.

Government

Palatine operates under the Council–manager form of local government. Six councilmen are elected from their respective districts, while the entire village elects the Village Clerk and the Mayor. The council then hires a Village Manager to oversee the town's day-to-day operation. The current mayor is Jim Schwantz.

Education

Public schools

Palatine is part of Community Consolidated School District 15 for public elementary schools and Township High School District 211 for public high schools. Schools located in Palatine include:
 Gray M. Sanborn School
 Hunting Ridge School
 Jane Addams School
 Lake Louise School
 Lincoln School
 Marion Jordan School
 Pleasant Hill School
 Stuart R. Paddock School
 Virginia Lake School
 Walter R. Sundling Junior High
 Winston Campus Junior High
 Palatine High School
 William Fremd High School
 District 211 Academy-North

Private schools
Saint Theresa (Catholic) (Preschool-8)
Saint Thomas of Villanova (Catholic) (Preschool-8)
Immanuel Lutheran (Lutheran) (Preschool-8)

Independent schools
Quest Academy (Preschool-8)
Acton Academy (K-12)
 The Chicago Northwest Suburban Chinese School holds its classes at William Fremd High School. The school serves students in grades preschool through 10.

College
William Rainey Harper College

Notable people

 Michael Bradley, midfielder with the US National Team and Toronto FC; lived in Palatine
 Perry Caravello, actor and comedian, lived in Palatine as a child
 J. Michael Durnil – president of the Simon Youth Foundation, former senior vice president of the Gay and Lesbian Alliance Against Defamation, and former administrator at Roosevelt University
 Mauro Fiore, Academy Award-winning cinematographer; attended Palatine High School
 Gudy Gaskill, mountaineer, driving force behind the creation of the Colorado Trail
 John Gegenhuber, actor
 Belle C. Greene, novelist, spent summers here from 1910 until her death in 1926
 Vicki Gunvalson, cast member of The Real Housewives of Orange County
 Stanley M. Hough, thoroughbred racehorse trainer
 Todd Hundley, catcher with the Mets, Cubs, and Dodgers; attended William Fremd High School
 Liz Johnson, professional bowler and USBC Hall of Famer; moved to Palatine in 2017 (originally from Cheektowaga, New York)
 Wendell E. Jones, educator, businessman, and politician
 Thymme Jones, drummer for Cheer-Accident
 Larry Lujack, radio personality; lived in Palatine while hosting on WLS
 Carol Marin, journalist (NBC 5 Chicago, Chicago Tonight); attended Palatine High School
 Christina Moore, actress (MADtv, Jessie)
 Richard A. Mugalian, lawyer and politician
 Kris Myers, drummer for Umphrey's McGee
 Ted Nugent, guitarist and singer; grew up in Palatine
 Bernard E. Pedersen, businessman and Illinois state legislator
 Frederik Pohl, science-fiction writer and critic
 John Ratcliffe, member of the United States House of Representatives from Texas's 4th congressional district from 2015 to 2020.
 David Saunders, wide receiver and linebacker with several arena football teams
 Jim Schwantz, linebacker with the Chicago Bears, San Francisco 49ers, and Dallas Cowboys; mayor of Palatine
 Mike Tauchman (born 1990), outfielder for the San Francisco Giants of Major League Baseball
 Scott Tolzien, quarterback of the Indianapolis Colts, Green Bay Packers and former quarterback of the Wisconsin Badgers
 Taylor Hill, Victoria's Secret model; born in Palatine.
 Rollin S. Williamson, state politician and judge

Sister cities
 Fontenay-le-Comte, Vendée, France

Musical group
 Born of Osiris, Metal band; most of the members attended William Fremd High School.

References

External links

 Village of Palatine official website

 
Villages in Illinois
Chicago metropolitan area
Villages in Cook County, Illinois
Populated places established in 1866
1866 establishments in Illinois